HMS Granado was a Serpent-class bomb vessel of the Royal Navy, one of ten such vessels commissioned in 1695 to support land assaults on continental ports. She saw active service in the Nine Years' War as part of the fleets commanded by Admirals Berkeley and Rooke. She was subsequently assigned to cruising duties in the Mediterranean.

In 1711 Granado accompanied her sister ship  on the British expedition along North America's St Lawrence River. In 1714 she returned to Woolwich for repairs, where she was decommissioned and placed in ordinary. She was broken up at Woolwich Dockyard on 9 May 1718.

Citations

References

Further reading

1690s ships
Ships built in Deptford
Bomb vessels of the Royal Navy